Georg Mischon (born 28 July 1907, date of death unknown) was a Swiss field handball player who competed in the 1936 Summer Olympics.

He was part of the Swiss field handball team, which won the bronze medal. He played four matches.

External links
Georg Mischon's profile at databaseOlympics.com

1907 births

Year of death missing

Field handball players at the 1936 Summer Olympics

Olympic bronze medalists for Switzerland
Olympic handball players of Switzerland
Swiss male handball players
Olympic medalists in handball
Medalists at the 1936 Summer Olympics